John Gabriel Perboyre, CM (1802–1840) was a French priest of the Congregation of the Mission, who served as a missionary in China, where he suffered martyrdom. He was canonized in 1996 by Pope John Paul II.

Life

Early life
Perboyre was born in 1802 at Le Puech (now in the commune of Montgesty), Lot, France, one of eight children born to Pierre Perboyre and Marie Rigal, who ran a farm. (Five of them would enter either the Vincentian Fathers or the Daughters of Charity.) He led a routine childhood and youth, displaying no particular religious fervor. This changed in 1816, however, after his younger brother, Louis, was accepted into the Vincentian seminary recently founded in Montauban by their uncle, Jacques Perboyre, C.M. John Gabriel was asked by their parents to accompany his brother until he had adapted to his new environment. To his surprise, John Gabriel felt drawn to follow this life himself.

When the teachers at the minor seminary saw Perboyre's intelligence and piety, they suggested that he enroll formally in the seminary. He wrote to his father, offering to return to help on the farm should his father wish, but indicating that he felt that he was called to serve as a priest. His parents gave him their blessing and full support in this.

Religious life
Perboyre entered the novitiate of the Congregation of the Mission (Lazarists) at the minor seminary of Montauban in December 1818. On the feast of the Holy Innocents 1820, he made the four promises of the Congregation, hoping to serve in its overseas missions. He was ordained to the priesthood on 23 September 1825, in the chapel of the Daughters of Charity, by Louis Dubourg, PSS, newly installed as the Bishop of Montauban, and on the following day he celebrated Mass for the first time. In 1832 he was assigned by the superiors of the Congregation to supervise the novitiate in Paris.

Perboyre had been held back from his longing to serve in China by his poor health. His brother Louis, on the other hand was sent to China. Unfortunately he died in the course of the journey there. This prompted John Gabriel to volunteer to replace his brother. He was approved for this, with the hope that the sea voyage would improve his health.

Missionary
Perboyre arrived in Macau in August 1835, where he began the study of the Chinese language. On 21 December 1835, he began his journey to Ho-Nan in China, the mission assigned him, in a junk ship. The journey took him five months, which required months of recovery. He then proceeded to spend the rest of his time of service serving the poverty-stricken people of the region. In January 1838, he was transferred to the mission of Hubei. In September 1839, persecutions against Christians broke out in Hubei, and Perboyre was one of the first victims.

In 1839 the viceroy of the province began a persecution and used the local mandarins to obtain the names of priests and catechists in their areas. In September 1839, the Mandarin of Hubei, where there was a Vincentian mission center, sent soldiers to arrest the missionaries. Perboyre was meeting informally with some other priests of the region when the soldiers arrived to seize them. The priests scattered and hid, but one catechist, under torture, gave away where Perboyre was hiding. He was stripped of his garments and clothed with rags, bound, and, over the course of time, was dragged from tribunal to tribunal. At each trial, he was treated inhumanly. Finally, he was taken to Wuchang, and after torture, was condemned to death.

The sentence was confirmed by an imperial edict in 1840, and on 11 September of that year, Perboyre was led to death with seven criminals. He was strangled to death on a cross at Wuchang. His body was retrieved and buried in the mission cemetery by a catechist.

Veneration
After the obligatory waiting period of five years after death for seeking a person's canonization had expired, a cause for him was introduced to the Holy See. He was beatified by Pope Leo XIII in 1889, and later canonized by Pope John Paul II in 1996 on 2 June. In the meantime, his remains were returned from China to France, where they were entombed for veneration in the chapel of the Vincentian Motherhouse in Paris, Saint Vincent de Paul Chapel.

Prayer of St. John Gabriel Perboyre to Jesus
Saint John Gabriel Perboyre composed this prayer in the 19th century. This transformational prayer builds towards Saint Paul's statement in Galatians 2:20: "I live – now not I – But Christ lives in me".

O my Divine Saviour,
Transform me into Yourself.
May my hands be the hands of Jesus.
Grant that every faculty of my body
May serve only to glorify You.

Above all,
Transform my soul and all its powers
So that my memory, will and affection
May be the memory, will and affections
Of Jesus.

I pray You
To destroy in me
All that is not of You.
Grant that I may live
But in You, by You and for You,
So that I may truly say,
With St. Paul,
"I live – now not I –
But Christ lives in me".

Notes

External links

1802 births
1840 deaths
People from Lot (department)
Vincentians
19th-century French Roman Catholic priests
French Roman Catholic missionaries
Roman Catholic missionaries in China
People executed by the Qing dynasty
French people executed abroad
People executed by ligature strangulation
19th-century Roman Catholic martyrs
Canonizations by Pope John Paul II
French Roman Catholic saints
19th-century Christian saints
Vincentian saints
Executed people from Midi-Pyrénées
French expatriates in China